"Matty Groves", also known as "Little Musgrave and Lady Barnard" or "Little Musgrave", is a ballad probably originating in Northern England that describes an adulterous tryst between a young man and a noblewoman that is ended when the woman's husband discovers and kills them. It is listed as Child ballad number 81 and number 52 in the Roud Folk Song Index. This song exists in many textual variants and has several variant names. The song dates to at least 1613, and under the title Little Musgrave and Lady Barnard is one of the Child ballads collected by 19th-century American scholar Francis James Child.

Synopsis

Little Musgrave (or Matty Groves, Little Matthew Grew and other variations) goes to church on a holy day either "the holy word to hear" or "to see fair ladies there". He sees Lord Barnard's wife, the fairest lady there, and realises that she is attracted to him. She invites him to spend the night with her, and he agrees when she tells him her husband is away from home. Her page overhears the conversation and goes to find Lord Barnard (Arlen, Daniel, Arnold, Donald, Darnell, Darlington) and tells him that Musgrave is in bed with his wife. Lord Barnard promises the page a large reward if he is telling the truth and to hang him if he is lying. Lord Barnard and his men ride to his home, where he surprises the lovers in bed. Lord Barnard tells Musgrave to dress because he doesn't want to be accused of killing a naked man. Musgrave says he dare not because he has no weapon, and Lord Barnard gives him the better of two swords.  In the subsequent duel Little Musgrave wounds Lord Barnard, who then kills him. (However, in one version "Magrove" instead runs away, naked but alive.)

Lord Barnard then asks his wife whether she still prefers Little Musgrave to him and when she says she would prefer a kiss from the dead man's lips to her husband and all his kin, he kills her. He then says he regrets what he has done and orders the lovers to be buried in a single grave, with the lady at the top because "she came of the better kin". In some versions Barnard is hanged, or kills himself, or finds his own infant son dead in his wife's body. Many versions omit one or more parts of the story.

It has been speculated that the original names of the characters, Little Musgrave and Lady Barnard, come from place names in the north of England (specifically Little Musgrave in Westmorland and Barnard Castle in County Durham). The place name "Bucklesfordbury", found in both English and American versions of the song, is of uncertain origin.

Some versions of the ballad include elements of an alba, a poetic form in which lovers part after spending a night together.

Early printed versions
There are few broadside versions. There are three different printings in the Bodleian Library's Broadside Ballads Online, all dating from the second half of the seventeenth century. One, The lamentable Ditty of the little Mousgrove, and the Lady Barnet from the collection of Anthony Wood, has a handwritten note by Wood on the reverse stating that "the protagonists were alive in 1543".

Below are the first four verses as written in a version published in 1658.As it fell one holy-day, 

Hay downe 

As many be in the yeare, 

When young men and maids together did goe, 

Their mattins and masse to heare, 

Little Musgrave came to the church-dore; 

Hay downe 

The preist was at private masse; 

But he had more minde of the faire women 

Than he had of Our Lady’s grace. 

Then one of them was clad in green, 

Hay downe 

Another was clad in pall, 

And then came in my lord Bernard’s wife, 

The fairest amongst them all. 

She cast an eye on Little Musgrave, 

Hay downe 

As bright as the summer sun; 

And then bethought this Little Musgrave, 

This lady’s heart have I woonn.

Traditional recordings
It seems that the ballad had largely died out in the British Isles by the time folklorists began collecting songs. Cecil Sharp collected a version from an Agnes Collins in London in 1908, the only known version to have been collected in England. James Madison Carpenter recorded some Scottish versions, probably in the early 1930s, which can be heard on the Vaughan Williams Memorial Library website. The Scottish singer Jeannie Robertson was recorded on separate occasions singing a traditional version of the song entitled "Matty Groves" in the late 1950s by Alan Lomax, Peter Kennedy and Hamish Henderson. However, according to the Tobar an Dualchais website, Robertson may have learned her version from Johnny Wells and Sandy Paton, Paton being an American singer and folk song collector.

Dozens of traditional versions of the ballad were recorded in the Appalachian region. Jean Bell Thomas recorded Green Maggard singing "Lord Daniel" in Ashland, Kentucky in 1934, which was released on the anthology 'Kentucky Mountain Music' Yazoo YA 2200. Bascom Lamar Lunsford was recorded singing a version called "Lord Daniel's Wife" in 1935. Samuel Harmon, known as "Uncle" Sam Harmon, was recorded by Herbert Halpert in Maryville, Tennessee in 1939 singing a traditional version. The influential Appalachian folk singer Jean Ritchie had her family version of the ballad, called "Little Musgrave", recorded by Alan Lomax in 1949, who made a reel-to-reel recording of it in his apartment in Greenwich Village; she later released a version on her album Ballads from her Appalachian Family Tradition (1961). In August 1963, John Cohen recorded Dillard Chandler singing "Mathie Groves" in Sodom, North Carolina, whilst Nimrod Workman, another Appalachian singer, had a traditional version of the song recorded in 1974.

The folklorist Helen Hartness Flanders recorded many versions in New England in the 1930s and 40s, all of which can be heard online in the Flanders Ballad Collection.

Canadian folklorists such as Helen Creighton, Kenneth Peacock and Edith Fowke recorded about a dozen versions in Canada, mostly in Nova Scotia and Newfoundland.

A number of songs and tales collected in the Caribbean are based on, or refer to, the ballad.

Textual variants and related ballads

Some of the versions of the song subsequently recorded differ from Child's catalogued version. The earliest published version appeared in 1658 (see Literature section below). A copy was also printed on a broadside by Henry Gosson, who is said to have printed between 1607 and 1641. Some variation occurs in where Matty is first seen; sometimes at church, sometimes playing ball.

Matty Groves also shares some mid-song stanzas with the ballad "Fair Margaret and Sweet William" (Child 74, Roud 253).

Other names for the ballad:
 Based on the lover
 Little Sir Grove
 Little Massgrove
 Matthy Groves
 Wee Messgrove
 Little Musgrave
 Young Musgrave
 Little Mushiegrove
 Based on the lord
 Lord Aaron
 Lord Arlen
 Lord Arnold
 Lord Barlibas
 Lord Barnabas
 Lord Barnaby
 Lord Barnard
 Lord Barnett
 Lord Bengwill
 Lord Darlen
 Lord Darnell
 Lord Donald
 Based on a combination of names
 Little Musgrave and Lady Barnard
 Little Musgrave and Lady Barnet
 Lord Barnett and Little Munsgrove
 Lord Vanner’s Wife [and Magrove]

Literature

The earliest known reference to the ballad is in Beaumont and Fletcher's 1613 play The Knight of the Burning Pestle:

And some they whistled, and some they sung,
Hey, down, down!
And some did loudly say,
Ever as the Lord Barnet's horn blew,
Away, Musgrave, away!

Al Hine's 1961 novel Lord Love a Duck opens and closes with excerpts from the ballad, and borrows the names Musgrave and Barnard for two characters.

Deborah Grabien's third book in the Haunted Ballad series, Matty Groves (2005), puts a different spin on the ballad.

Commercial recordings
Versions of some performers could be mentioned as the most notable or successful, including those by Jean Ritchie or Martin Carthy.
{| class="wikitable"
|-
! Year !! Release (Album / "Single") !! Performer !! Variant !! Notes
|-
| 1956 || John Jacob Niles Sings American Folk Songs || John Jacob Niles || Little Mattie Groves ||
|-
| 1958 || Shep Ginandes Sings Folk Songs || Shep Ginandes || Mattie Groves || 
|-
| 1960 || British Traditional Ballads in the Southern Mountains, Volume 2 || Jean Ritchie || Little Musgrave ||
|-
| 1962 || Joan Baez in Concert || Joan Baez || Matty Groves ||
|-
| 1964 || Introducing the Beers Family || Beers Family || Mattie Groves ||
|-
| 1966 || Home Again! || Doc Watson || Matty Groves ||
|-
| 1969 || Liege & Lief || Fairport Convention || Matty Groves || Set to the tune of the otherwise unrelated Appalachian song "Shady Grove"; this hybrid version has therefore entered other performers' repertoires over time (the frequency of this as well as the similarity of the names has led to the erroneous assumption that "Shady Grove" is directly descended from "Matty Groves"). Several live recordings also.
|-
| 1969 || Prince Heathen || Martin Carthy || Little Musgrave and Lady Barnard ||
|-
| 1970 || Ballads and Songs || Nic Jones || Little Musgrave ||
|-
| 1976 || Christy Moore || Christy Moore || Little Musgrave || Set to a tune by Andy Irvine
|-
| 1977 || Never Set the Cat on Fire || Frank Hayes || Like a Lamb to the Slaughter || Done as a parody talking blues version
|-
| 1980 || The Woman I Loved So Well || Planxty || Little Musgrave || 
|-
| 1990 || Masque || Paul Roland || Matty Groves ||
|-
| 1992 || Just Gimme Somethin' I'm Used To || Norman and Nancy Blake || Little Matty Groves ||
|-
| 1992 || Out Standing in a Field || The Makem Brother and Brian Sullivan || Matty Groves ||
|-
| 1993 || In Good King Arthur's Day || Graham Dodsworth || Little Musgrave||
|-
| 1994 ||You Could Be the Meadow || Eden Burning || ||
|-
| 1995 || Live at the Mineshaft Tavern || ThaMuseMeant || ||
|-
| 1997 || On and On || Fiddler's Green || Matty Groves ||
|-
| 1994 ||You Could Be the Meadow || Eden Burning || ||
|-
| 1999 ||Trad Arr Jones || John Wesley Harding || Little Musgrave ||
|-
| 2000 || Hepsankeikka || Tarujen Saari || Kaunis neito || (In Finnish)
|-
| 2001 || Listen, Listen || Continental Drifters || Matty Groves || 
|-
| 2002 || Ralph Stanley || Ralph Stanley || Little Mathie Grove ||
|-
| 2004 || Live 2004 || Planxty || Little Musgrave ||
|-
| 2005 || Dark Holler: Old Love Songs and Ballads || Dillard Chandler || Mathie Grove || Acapella Appalachian.
|-
| 2005 || De Andere Kust || Kadril || Matty Groves ||
|-
| 2007 || Season of the Witch || The Strangelings || Matty Groves ||
|-
| 2007 || Prodigal Son || Martin Simpson || Little Musgrave ||
|-
| 2008 || The Peacemaker's Chauffeur || Jason Wilson || Matty Groves || Reggae version, featuring Dave Swarbrick & Brownman Ali
|-
| 2009 || Folk Songs || James Yorkston and the Big Eyes Family Players || Little Musgrave ||
|-
| 2009 || Alela & Alina || Alela Diane featuring Alina Hardin || Matty Groves, Lord Arland ||
|-
| 2009 || Orphans: Brawlers, Bawlers & Bastards || Tom Waits || Mathie Grove||
|-
| 2010 || Sweet Joan || Sherwood || Matty Groves|| (In Russian)
|-
| 2011 || Birds' Advice || Elizabeth Laprelle || Mathey Groves
|-
| 2011 || "Little Musgrave" || The Musgraves || Little Musgrave|| YouTube video recorded to explain the band's name
|-
| 2011 || In Silence || Marc Carroll || Matty Groves||
|-
| 2012 || Retrospective || The Kennedys || Matty Groves||
|-
| 2013 || The Irish Connection 2 || Johnny Logan ||  ||
|-
| 2013 || Fugitives || Moriarty || Matty Groves ||
|-
| 2019 || Dark Turn of Mind || Iona Fyfe || Little Musgrave || Scots folklore variant written in Scottish English
|-
| 2019 || Návrat krále || Asonance || Matty Groves || (In Czech)
|}

Film and television
Film
In the film Songcatcher (2000), the song is performed by Emmy Rossum and Janet McTeer.

Television
In season 5 episode 2, "Gently with Class" (2012), of the British television series Inspector George Gently, the song is performed by Ebony Buckle, playing the role of singer Ellen Mallam in that episode, singing it as "Matty Groves".

Musical variants
In 1943, the English composer Benjamin Britten used this folk song as the basis of a choral piece entitled "The Ballad of Little Musgrave and Lady Barnard".

"The Big Musgrave", a parody by the Kipper Family, appears on their 1988 LP Fresh Yesterday. The hero in this version is called Big Fatty Groves.

Frank Hayes created a talking blues version of Matty Groves called "Like a Lamb to the Slaughter," which won the 1994 Pegasus Award for "Best Risqué Song."

"Maggie Gove", a parody by UK comedy folk-band The Bar-Steward Sons of Val Doonican, appears on their 2022 album Rugh & Ryf. The anti-hero in this version is Margaret Gove, a folk-singer of traditional broadside ballads. The song features guest appearances from Dave Pegg and Dave Mattacks from Fairport Convention.

See also
The previous and next Child Ballads:
"The Bonny Birdy"
"Old Robin of Portingale"

References

External links
 "Little Musgrave and Lady Barnard". Francis James Child. traditionalmusic.co.uk "Matty Groves". Fairport Convention. celtic-lyrics.com.
 "Little Musgrave and Lady Barnard". sacred-texts.com "Mattie Groves". contemplator.com''
 Broadside Ballads Online

English folk songs
17th-century songs
Folk ballads
Fairport Convention songs
Joan Baez songs
Child Ballads
Northumbrian folklore
Murder ballads
Uxoricide in fiction